Gmina Brzeziny may refer to either of the following rural administrative districts in Poland:
Gmina Brzeziny, Łódź Voivodeship
Gmina Brzeziny, Greater Poland Voivodeship